Lalromawia (born 15 June 1998) is an Indian professional footballer who plays as a midfielder for Sreenidi Deccan in the I-League.

Career
Hailing from a small village named Samlukhai in Mizoram, Lalromawia comes from a very humble background. His father is a farmer by profession. He has two other siblings who help their father in farming. Lalromawia made his professional debut in the 2017–18 Mizoram Premier League for Chanmari West FC. His club finished seventh among eight clubs that season. Lalromawia had netted twice in that year.

In the 2017–18 Santosh Trophy, Lalromawia scored 4 goals for Mizoram football team and was one of the best player of the tournament. Lalromawia played for Chhinga Veng F.C. in 2018–19 season. He scored 4 goals from 15 appearances and had few assists to his name in the 2018–19 I-League 2nd Division. Chhinga Veng were the runner-ups of I-League 2nd Division and Mizoram Premier League (MPL).

In the 2019–20 season he signed for Gokulam Kerala F.C. 
He made his professional debut for the Gokulam Kerala against Aizawl F.C. on 30 November 2019, He came on in as substitute in the 75th minute as Gokulam Kerala won 2–1.

Career statistics

Club

Honours

Club
Gokulam Kerala

 Durand Cup : 2019

 I-League
 Champions (1): 2020–21

References

1998 births
Living people
People from Aizawl
Indian footballers
Gokulam Kerala FC players  
Footballers from Mizoram
I-League players
Association football midfielders
Chanmari FC players
Chhinga Veng FC players
Sreenidi Deccan FC players